Muhibullah, also spelled Mohebullah/Mohibullah and in other ways, is a male Muslim given name meaning God lover. It may refer to
Muhibbullah Babunagari (born 1934), Bangladeshi Islamic scholar
Muhibullo Abdulkarim Umarov (born 1980), Tajik held in Guantanamo
Muhebullah (Guantanamo detainee 974) (born ca. 1981), Afghan
Moheb Ullah Borekzai (born 1982), Afghan held in Guantanamo
Mohibullah "Mo" Khan (died 1995), Pakistani squash player
Mohibullah Khan, Pakistani squash player (not the same as the one above)
Mian Muhibullah Kakakhel, Pakistani lawyer
Mohibullah Samim, Afghan provincial governor
Mohib Ullah, Rohingya peace activist, who was murdered in 2021

Arabic masculine given names